Harmful If Swallowed is the first CD/DVD set from American comedian Dane Cook. It was released on July 22, 2003.

The attached DVD contains Dane's appearances on Comedy Central Presents (both the edited-for-television and unedited hour-long versions), Comics Come Home 5, and Premium Blend. As of 2014, sales in the United States have exceeded 1,404,000 copies, according to Nielsen SoundScan.

Original version
Before this version produced by Comedy Central Records came out, there was a different version of this album that was independently produced by Cook himself that contained a track lampooning Steve Irwin, the Crocodile Hunter. This track was removed for the "official" CD / DVD release. To fill the gap of the missing track, the bonus track was added in this cut of the album.

The original release contained almost entirely different artwork and liner notes.

Track listing
Intro – 0:46
Parking Structure – 1:28
Umm, Helllllo? – 3:50
Car Accident – 2:43
Tire in the Face – 2:07
Would You Rather... – 6:03
Fireman & Policeman & Miniature Golf Course Security Guard – 2:07
The BK Lounge – 3:29
Pregnant Lady – 1:48
Five Sisters – 0:58
Slip 'n' Bleed – 0:59 – referencing Slip 'N Slide
Speak 'n' Spell – 1:03
Operation – Monopoly – 2:16
Don't Tickle Me – 0:48
Bathroom – 2:24
Pranks – 1:48
Fuk and the Finga – 1:44
Just Wanna Dance – 4:18
Head – 2:34
Nightmare – 3:05
Hopped Up on the Q – 1:12
Not So Kool-Aid – 1:28
Pick a Number Please! – 1:44
Bonus Track – 7:36

References

Dane Cook albums
2003 live albums
2003 video albums
Live video albums
Comedy Central Records live albums
Stand-up comedy albums
Spoken word albums by American artists
Live spoken word albums
Comedy Central Records video albums